Pierre Lamaison (1 August 1948 – 4 June 2001) was a French anthropologist.

Works 
 Ethnologie et protection de la nature : Pour une politique du patrimoine ethnologique dans Les parcs naturels
 Rapport au Ministère de l'environnement, Direction De La Protection De La Nature 
 France et Pierre Lamaison et Denis Chevallier 
 Éditions de l'École des hautes études en sciences sociales, 
 Généalogie de l'Europe : De la préhistoire au XXe 
 Pierre Lamaison (direction) ; Pierre Vidal-Naquet (conseiller historique)
 Hachette, 
 L'impossible mariage : Violence et parenté en Gévaudan, XVIIe, XVIIIe et XIXe siècles
 Élisabeth Claverie et Pierre Lamaison 
 Hachette Littérature 

1948 births
2001 deaths
French anthropologists
Winners of the Prix Broquette-Gonin (literature)
20th-century anthropologists